The 1993 Princeton Tigers football team was an American football team that represented Princeton University during the 1993 NCAA Division I-AA football season. Princeton finished third in the Ivy League.

In their seventh year under head coach Steve Tosches, the Tigers compiled an 8–2 record and outscored opponents 241 to 136. Keith Elias and Reggie Harris were the team captains.

Princeton's 5–2 conference record placed third in the Ivy League standings. The Tigers outscored Ivy opponents 151 to 106. 

Though unranked in the preseason national rankings, Princeton's seven-game win streak to open the season saw it enter the weekly top 25 in mid-October, reaching as high as No. 16. After its season-ending loss to unranked Dartmouth, Princeton dropped out of the poll and ended the year unranked.

Princeton played its home games at Palmer Stadium on the university campus in Princeton, New Jersey.

Schedule

References

Princeton
Princeton Tigers football seasons
Princeton Tigers football